Hypsidoris (from  , 'height' and   'dagger') is an extinct genus of catfish, classified within its own family Hypsidoridae, from the Eocene epoch of North America.

It also had a vibration-sensitive organ called the Weberian apparatus, which consisted of specialized vertebrae at the front of the spinal column which passed vibrations  to the inner ear, using the swim bladder as a resonance chamber. For defense against predators, Hypsidoris had large spines at the front of each pectoral fin. Like modern catfish, it would probably have eaten smaller fish, along with crayfish and other bottom-dwelling creatures.

There are two species. H. farsonensis is from the Early Middle Eocene of Wyoming and H. oregonensis is from the Middle Eocene of Oregon.

References

Prehistoric ray-finned fish genera
Catfish genera
Eocene fish
Eocene fish of North America